Mina Popović (born 16 September 1994) is a Serbian volleyball player.

Club career
On club level, Popović ha played for OK Crvena Zvezda, Obiettivo Risarcimento, Volley Bergamo, Azzurra Volley San Casciano and Volleyball Casalmaggiore. With OK Crvena Zvezda she won two Serbian volleyball league titles (2012, 2013) and three Serbian volleyball cup titles (2012, 2013, 2014).

Galatasaray
She signed a 1-year contract with Galatasaray HDI Sigorta on August 17, 2022.

National team career
As part of the Serbia national volleyball team, Popović won bronze medal at the 2015 European Games and the 2015 European Volleyball Championship, and the gold medal at the 2017 European Volleyball Championship.

References

External links
Player profile at worldofvolley.com
Player profile at the 2017 World Grand Prix
Player profile at the Olympic Sports Management 

1994 births
Living people
Serbian women's volleyball players
Sportspeople from Kraljevo
Volleyball players at the 2015 European Games
Expatriate volleyball players in Italy
Serbian expatriate sportspeople in Italy
European Games medalists in volleyball
European Games bronze medalists for Serbia
European champions for Serbia
Volleyball players at the 2020 Summer Olympics
Olympic volleyball players of Serbia
Medalists at the 2020 Summer Olympics
Olympic medalists in volleyball
Olympic bronze medalists for Serbia
Galatasaray S.K. (women's volleyball) players